Richard Jerome Kennedy (born December 23, 1932 in Jefferson City, Missouri), is an American writer of children's books and a supporter of the Oxfordian theory of Shakespeare authorship. He was the first to suggest that John Ford was the author of the 578-line poem A Funeral Elegy which in 1995 had been touted by Donald Foster as being written by William Shakespeare.

Life
He was educated at Portland State University (B.A., liberal arts, 1958) and earned a teaching certificate in elementary education from the University of Oregon. Teaching elementary school proved unsatisfactory, so he tried other jobs, including bookstore owner, deep sea fisherman, moss picker, custodian, cabdriver, and archivist, before turning to writing.

Shakespeare authorship question

Kennedy has been a long-time advocate of the theory that Edward de Vere, 17th Earl of Oxford, was the person actually responsible for writing the works of William Shakespeare. He is a founding member of the Shakespeare Fellowship, and in 2005 he proposed that Shakespeare's Stratford monument was originally built to honor John Shakespeare, William's father, who by tradition was a "considerable dealer in wool".

Notable works
The Porcelain Man, illus. Marcia Sewall, 1976
The Blue Stone, illus. Ronald Himler, 1976
The Dark Princess, illus. Donna Diamond, 1978
Amy's Eyes, illus. Richard Egielski, 1985

Awards

American Library Association Notable Book List, 1976, for The Blue Stone
American Library Association Notable Book List, 1978, for The Dark Princess
Pacific Northwest Booksellers Association Award, 1976, for The Blue Stone and The Porcelain Man
Association of Logos Bookstores Award, 1985, for Amy's Eyes
German Rattenfänger (Rat Catcher, i.e. Pied Piper) award as best foreign book translated in 1988 for Amy's Eyes

References

External links
 Camelot, God wot! or: What a Woman Wants
 The Snow Queen, a Christmas Musical
 Come Again in Spring, an animated telling of Come Again in the Spring. Directed, designed and animated by Belinda Oldford, produced by the National Film Board of Canada
 "The Woolpack Man"
 

1932 births
American children's writers
Living people
Oxfordian theory of Shakespeare authorship
Portland State University alumni
People from Jefferson City, Missouri
Shakespeare authorship theorists
University of Oregon alumni